Scott Gibson (born 26 August 1984) is an English former professional footballer who played as a midfielder. He now works as the academy director of USL Championship side Pittsburgh Riverhounds.

Career
After studying business at Duquesne University, Gibson turned professional with the Pittsburgh Riverhounds in the USL Second Division in 2008, making his professional debut on 7 June 2008 in a 5–3 away defeat to the Wilmington Hammerheads.

He now works as the academy director for the Riverhounds.

References

External links
 
Pittsburgh Riverhounds bio
Duquesne University bio

1984 births
Living people
Duquesne Dukes men's soccer players
English footballers
English expatriate footballers
Pittsburgh Riverhounds SC players
People from Saltburn-by-the-Sea
Association football midfielders
English expatriate sportspeople in the United States
Expatriate soccer players in the United States